Senator Díaz de la Portilla may refer to:

Alex Díaz de la Portilla (born 1964), Florida State Senate
Miguel Díaz de la Portilla (born 1963), Florida State Senate